Idrettslaget Morild is a Norwegian association football club from Myre, Øksnes, Nordland.

It is named after Noctilucales. It was founded on 26 July 1937 as IL Bjørn ("Bear"), but seeing as another team with this name existed, they had to change to IL Morild. It formerly had sections for track and field and skiing.

The men's football team currently plays in the Fifth Division, the sixth tier of Norwegian football. It last played in the Norwegian Second Division in 1998 and the Norwegian Third Division in 2010.

References

 Official site 

Football clubs in Norway
Sport in Nordland
Association football clubs established in 1937
Defunct athletics clubs in Norway
1937 establishments in Norway